Ivan Čabrinović (born in 1939) is a Serbian former football manager and player.

Playing career
Born in Kragujevac, he played with local side FK Radnički Kragujevac before signing with Yugoslav club FK Partizan in winter-break of 1967–68 Yugoslav First League season. He made six appearances and scored three goals until the end of the season with Partizan. At age of 27 he had a major leg injury that ended his career.

Coaching career
After retiring, he found himself notoriety as coach. He coached the Yugoslav team at the Universiade in Zagreb, the Yugoslav amateur national team, and the Yugoslav team at the Mediterranean Games. With the U-21 Yugoslav team he won silver at the UEFA European Championship when they lost against the Soviet Union in Sevastopol and then he was with the main Yugoslav team when the country got disqualified due to UN economic sanctions imposed due to the Yugoslav wars.

Then, he coached Bahrain on their 1994 Asian Games and Gulf tournaments, and also worked at club level in Japan, Kuwait, Algeria and Bahrain. However, it all started when he got his coaching license and was brought by FK Zemun to replace Stjepan Bobek in a time when the club had fallen to the Serbian Republic League, what was a third level at backthen Yugoslav league system. He stayed in Zemun 8 years and brought emun back to the top of Yugoslav football.

References

Living people
1939 births
Sportspeople from Kragujevac
Serbian footballers
Yugoslav footballers
Association football midfielders
FK Radnički 1923 players
FK Partizan players
Yugoslav First League players
Serbian football managers
Yugoslav football managers
FK Zemun managers
FK Pelister managers
Serbia and Montenegro football managers
Serbia and Montenegro expatriate football managers